GCM NES is a core banking and financial software suite developed by GCM for use by retail banks.

It includes functions for universal banking, core banking, payments, money markets, insurance, securities processing, financial inclusion, treasury operations. There are also modules that deal with capital markets and the insurance business.

History

Software products
NES offers a suite of products, which are periodically evaluated by independent research firms like Forrester. The list of products include.

 BCOM
 BAC 
 CASH
 CASA
 TD
 LOAN
 ...
 ERP
 AP
 AR
 INV
 FA
 PRCH
 REQ
 CTR
 TNDR
 BILL
 Interface
 BaNCS interface
 GrapeBank interface

References

Financial software